The African Amateur Boxing Championships is the premier pan-continental annual competition for amateur boxing in Africa.  The championships are organised by the continent's governing body, the African Boxing Union (ABU). The first edition of the tournament took place in 1962.

Editions 
From 2017, it was held Men and Women in same country and same time.

Men's editions

Women's editions

Combined editions

All-time medal table

Men
As of 2015 inclueding men's events of the combined editions until 2022:

Women
As of 2014 inclueding women's events of the combined editions until 2022:

See also
 Boxing at the African Games
 World Amateur Boxing Championships

Results database
 http://amateur-boxing.strefa.pl/Championships/AAAChampionships.html

External links
Editions
 http://amateur-boxing.strefa.pl/Championships/AfricanWomensChampionships.html
 http://www.aiba.org/afbc-boxing-championships/ - 2017 Results

 
Boxing competitions
Recurring sporting events established in 1962
Amateur boxing
Boxing
Boxing in Africa